Mohammed Hassan El Joundi (Arabic: محمد حسن الجندي) (1 January 1938 – 25 February 2017) was a Moroccan dramatic artist and one of the most iconic Moroccan artists of the 20th century. He is a pioneer of Arab theater and an award-winning author, film director and actor.

Career 

He was a prolific radio and theater writer and have directed and starred in some of the most respected, memorable and endearing projects for radio, television and theater since the 1950s and until he died in 2017, including his groundbreaking fantasy series Al Azalia. He is a pioneer of musical theater in the Middle East and North Africa and has performed in prestigious venues all around world.

Some of his most memorable performances include Abu Jahl, Amr ibn Hisham in the Arabic version of the movie The Message, Rustam in the film Qadisiyah, Utbah ibn Rabiah in the 2012's historical drama Umar ibn al-Khattab, Hamadi in the 2011 film Taalab Assilah and Moha in the short series Ghadba.

On February 18, one week before his death, Mohammed Hassan El Joundi  attended the launch and signing of his autobiographical novel Weld Laksour  at Casablanca International Book Fair. It was his last project.

Gallery

References

External links

1939 births
Moroccan dramatists and playwrights
2017 deaths
Moroccan male television actors
Moroccan male film actors
Moroccan male stage actors
People from Marrakesh
21st-century Moroccan male actors
[[Moroccan male artists]]
Moroccan film directors